Balehar Khanpur  is a village in Kapurthala district of Punjab State, India. The village is administrated by a Sarpanch, who is an elected representative.

Demography 
According to the report published by Census India in 2011, Balehar Khanpur has a total number of 146 houses and population of 726 of which include 375 males and 351 females. Literacy rate of Balehar Khanpur is 76.57%, higher than state average of 75.84%. The population of children under the age of 6 years is 73 which is 10.06% of total population of Balehar Khanpur, and child sex ratio is approximately  622 lower than state average of 846.

Population data

Air travel connectivity 
The closest airport to the village is Sri Guru Ram Dass Jee International Airport.

Villages in Kapurthala

External links
  Villages in Kapurthala
 Kapurthala Villages List

References

Villages in Kapurthala district